Laura Salguero López is a former football striker. She played for CF Pozuelo, Estudiantes Huelva, AD Torrejón and Atlético Madrid in the Spanish First Division.

She was a member of the Spanish national team in the 1999 World Cup qualifying.

References

1978 births
Living people
Spanish women's footballers
Spain women's international footballers
Primera División (women) players
Atlético Madrid Femenino players
Women's association football forwards
CF Pozuelo de Alarcón Femenino players
AD Torrejón CF Femenino players